The Police Corps of Andorra is the national police of Andorra. In 2007, the force had 240 officers serving a population of approximately 85,000.

Structure
The police force consists of the Directorate of the Police, four divisions which carry out the various missions of the police, and two "functional groups".

Directorate of the Police

The Directorate of the Police is composed of a director, a deputy director who has the grade of police commissioner, a secretary, a planning and human resources officer and an administrative assistant. It directs police activities throughout the country. Its members are nominated by the Government of Andorra based on proposals from the Ministry of the Interior. The International Police Cooperation Office is part of the Directorate of Police, inside is the National Central Office of Interpol.

Divisions
There are four Divisions with the following responsibilities:

The Division of Criminal Police (similar to Kriminalpolizei) is in charge of criminal investigations and divided into two investigation units. The first one, responsible for investigations aimed both at prevention and repression of crime, has sections dealing with drugs, domestic violence, organised crime, general affairs, juveniles, and money laundering. The second investigates crimes brought to its attention and is also responsible for cases of climate accidents. 
The Division of Public Security and Proximity comprises two uniformed units whose role is to ensure the overall safety and security of residents. The "Unit for Citizens' Security" is a proximity police intended to prevent offences and maintaining public order. The "Unit for Citizens' Awareness," a detachment of the central police, operates the Information Room, answers public queries, coordinates external services and supervises detention conditions.
The Division of Police Support is responsible for operational support to the other divisions, as well as to the Directorate. It comprises six departments: analysis of criminal information; legal matters; information technology; training; prevention and social orientation; and management.
The Division of Transit and Borders comprises two uniformed units: the Traffic Unit (similar to highway patrol, motorcycle patrols to supervise the movement of vehicles at the national borders and intervene in case of accidents) and the Borders Unit (a border guard in charge of border immigration control) that works in co-operation with the Department of Immigration.

Groups
Six groups – for the protection of VIPs, bomb disposal, order maintenance, emergency situations, sniffer-dog training and mountain rescue – are formed by members of the four Divisions; are assembled in response to specific needs; and are assisted by colleagues from neighbouring countries, particularly in organising joint training programmes.

Equipment  
The Police Corps of Andorra is the more armed tactical team and they are referred as, Grup d'Intervencio Policia d'Andorra (GIPA) they are more armed than the average officer, these are some of the weapons they are issued:
 SIG Pro - standard sidearm pistol, similar to the one's carried by their French counterparts in law enforcement.
 Heckler & Koch MP5 submachine gun (standard issue)
 Benelli M4 shotgun (standard issue shotgun)

Police ground vehicles 
Fiat Panda
SEAT Altea
SEAT León
Škoda Superb
Renault Laguna II

Ranks

Functions

Grades

References

External links

 Police Service of Andorra

Law enforcement in Andorra
National police forces
National Central Bureaus of Interpol